Óscar García (born January 12, 1972) is a Spanish sprint canoer who competed in the early 1990s. At the 1992 Summer Olympics in Barcelona, he was eliminated in the semifinals of the K-1 1000 m event.

References
Sports-Reference.com profile

1972 births
Canoeists at the 1992 Summer Olympics
Living people
Olympic canoeists of Spain
Spanish male canoeists
20th-century Spanish people